The 2014–15 season was  Panionios Gymnastikos Syllogos Smyrnis'  124th season in existence and its 54th in Super League Greece, the top tier of Greek football. They also competed in the Greek Cup, reaching the quarter-finals.

Squad

Competitions

Super League Greece

League table

Greek Cup

Group stage

Knockout phase

References

Panionios F.C. seasons
Panionios